Peter Wiersum (born 1 November 1984 in Sutton Coldfield) is a Dutch former rowing coxswain. He is a three-time Olympian and won a world championship title in 2007.

He competed in the 2007 World Rowing Championships in Munich and steered the Dutch lightweight eights to the World title. He qualified for the 2008 Summer Olympics in Beijing with the Dutch eight made up by Olaf van Andel, Rogier Blink, Jozef Klaassen, Meindert Klem, David Kuiper, Diederik Simon, Olivier Siegelaar and Mitchel Steenman. Due to an injury, Siegelaar was replaced by Reinder Lubbers during the tournament.

At  the 2016 Summer Olympics in Rio de Janeiro he coxed the Dutch men's eight that won a bronze medal.

References

1984 births
Living people
Dutch male rowers
Rowers at the 2008 Summer Olympics
Rowers at the 2012 Summer Olympics
Olympic rowers of the Netherlands
Coxswains (rowing)
Sportspeople from Sutton Coldfield
World Rowing Championships medalists for the Netherlands
Rowers at the 2016 Summer Olympics
Olympic bronze medalists for the Netherlands
Olympic medalists in rowing
Medalists at the 2016 Summer Olympics